Mersin Büyükşehir Belediyesi SK (English: Mersin Metropolitan Municipality Sports Club) also known simply as Mersin BB is a basketball team based in the city of Mersin in Turkey, currently playing in the Turkish Basketball First League (TBL).

It is sponsorship by Mersin Metropolitan Municipality. Their home arena is the Edip Buran Arena with a capacity of 1,750 seats.

History
Mersin Büyükşehir Belediyesi was founded in 1993. The team was promotion 2004-2005 season to Turkish Basketball League from Turkish Second Basketball League. After spending 9 years in the top league, the team relegated to the TB2L in 2013-2014 season.

Season by season

Current team

Notable players

  Harun Erdenay
  Nedim Yücel
  Ümit Sonkol
  Kimani Ffriend
  Predrag Samardžiski
  Alex Scales
 - Bo McCalebb
  Dionte Christmas
  Chris Lofton
  David Holston
  Dominic James
  Ryan Sidney
  Gerald Fitch
  Jerry Johnson
  Michael Wright

See also
 Mersin Büyükşehir Belediyesi S.K. Women's Basketball

References

External links
Official website 
Eurobasket.com Page
TBLStat.net Profile
Facebook Page
Twitter Page
Instagram Page

 
Basketball teams in Turkey
Turkish Basketball Super League teams
Sport in Mersin